Romario Javier Caicedo Ante (born 23 May 1990) is an Ecuadorian footballer who plays for C.S. Emelec.

Having joined Emelec in 2017 from Fuerza Amarilla S.C. he has since signed a contract extension to stay at Emelec until 2025.

He was capped by the Ecuador national football team in a friendly against Trinidad and Tobago.

References

External links
 
 

Living people
1990 births
Ecuadorian footballers
Association football midfielders
Ecuador international footballers
C.D. Olmedo footballers
Fuerza Amarilla S.C. footballers
C.S. Emelec footballers
Ecuadorian Serie A players
Ecuadorian Serie B players
People from Eloy Alfaro Canton